Fort Simpson Island Airport  is located adjacent to Fort Simpson, Northwest Territories, Canada. Prior permission is required to land except in the case of an emergency.

Airlines
Wolverine Air
Simpson Air

See also
 List of airports in the Fort Simpson area

References

Registered aerodromes in the Dehcho Region